Cotelo is a surname. Notable people with the name include:

Emiliano Cotelo (born 1958), Uruguayan journalist and radio personality
Mario Cotelo (born 1975), Spanish retired professional footballer
Ruben Cotelo (1930–2006), Uruguayan writer, journalist and literary critic
Valeria Cotelo (born 1984), Argentine women's international footballer